Simonellite (1,1-dimethyl-1,2,3,4-tetrahydro-7-isopropyl phenanthrene) is a polycyclic aromatic hydrocarbon with a chemical formula C19H24. It is similar to retene.

Simonellite occurs naturally as an organic mineral derived from diterpenes present in conifer resins. It is named after its discoverer, Vittorio Simonelli (1860–1929), an Italian geologist. It forms colorless to white orthorhombic crystals. It occurs in Fognano, Tuscany, Italy.

Simonellite, together with cadalene, retene and ip-iHMN, is a biomarker of higher plants, which makes it useful for paleobotanic analysis of rock sediments.

See also
 Fichtelite
 Retene

References

Organic minerals
Phenanthrenes
Biomarkers
Diterpenes
Isopropyl compounds